YA, yA, or Ya may refer to:

Language
 Ya (arrow), the Japanese word for arrow
 Ya (Cyrillic) (Я), a Cyrillic alphabet letter
 Ya (Javanese) (ꦪ), a letter in the Javanese script
 Ya (kana), the Romanization of the Japanese kana や and ヤ
 Yāʼ, Arabic letter ي
 Ya, a vocative particle in Arabic and other Semitic languages
 ㅑ (ya), a letter in the Korean hangul alphabet

Units of measurement
 years ago (ya), a unit of time
 Yoctoampere (yA), an SI unit of electric current
 Yottampere (YA), an SI unit of electric current

Arts, entertainment, and media
¡Ya!, an album by the band Marquess
 Я (transliterated ya, meaning I am), a 2009 Russian sci-fi film (:ru:Я (фильм)) with Artur Smolyaninov and Oksana Akinshina
 Yahoo! Answers (YA), a community-driven question-and-answer site
 Young Ace (YA), a Japanese magazine
 Young adult fiction, fiction marketed to young adults

Other uses
 Ya (river), a river in Tynset municipality in Innlandet county, Norway
 Yet another (YA), a common initial part of acronyms
 YoungArts (YA), a scholarship program for American high school students

See also
 Ya-ya (disambiguation)
 Yah (disambiguation)
 Yaya (disambiguation)
 Yea (disambiguation)
 Yeah (disambiguation)